Black Clover is a Japanese anime series adapted from the manga of the same title written and illustrated by Yūki Tabata. Produced by Pierrot and directed by Tatsuya Yoshihara, the series is placed in a world where magic is a common everyday part of people's lives, and is centered around one of the only known person to not be able to use magic, Asta. Asta as well as his friend, rival, and adoptive brother Yuno, aspire to become the wizard king however to most people it would seem that Asta had no chance of becoming wizard king while Yuno was famous in his village as a prodigy. The series aired from October 3, 2017 to March 30, 2021 on TV Tokyo in Japan. Kazuyuki Fudeyasu wrote the scripts, Itsuko Takeda designed the characters, and Minako Seki composed the music. The first season, which adapts the first eight volumes of the manga, was initially listed as running for 13 episodes, but was later expanded to 51 episodes. The first two seasons each consisted of 51 episodes. The series uses twenty six different pieces of theme music: thirteen opening themes and thirteen ending themes.

An original video animation produced by Xebec that is based on the series was shown at the 2016 Jump Festa between November 27 and December 18, 2016. It was bundled with the 11th volume of the manga, which was released on May 2, 2017. A second original video animation was shown at the 2018 Jump Festa.

In 2017, both Crunchyroll and Funimation licensed the series for an English-language release in North America. Crunchyroll is simulcasting the series, while Funimation is producing an English dub as part of its Simuldub program as it airs. Their adaptation premiered on December 2, 2017, on Adult Swim's Toonami programming block. The first DVD and Blu-ray compilation was released by Avex Pictures on February 23, 2018, with individual volumes being released monthly. In February 2021, it was announced that the final episode of Black Clover would air on March 30, 2021, followed up by an anime film announcement for the series.

Series overview

Episode list

Season 1 (2017–18)

Season 2 (2018–19)

Season 3 (2019–20)

Season 4 (2020–21)

Notes

References

Black Clover